Alf's Button is a 1920 British silent fantasy comedy film directed by Cecil Hepworth and starring Leslie Henson, Alma Taylor and Gerald Ames. It was based on the 1920 novel Alf's Button by William Darlington. The film is about a British soldier who discovers a magic coat button which summons a genie to grant his various wishes. It was remade as a sound film in 1930.

It was shot at Walton Studios.

Plot
As described in a film magazine, during World War I, Alf (Henson) discovers that he has a brass button which, when he rubs it, summons Eustace (Carew), a genie. While in the trenches, the genie brings Alf and his friend Bill (MacAndrews) goblets of beer, pretty young women, a bath, and anything their hearts desire. Finally, Alf is discharged from the Army and marries Liz (Taylor), who returns the button to the genie.

Cast
 Leslie Henson as Alf Higgins
 Alma Taylor as Liz
 Gerald Ames as Lt. Denis Allen
 James Carew as Eustace, the genie
 Eileen Dennes as Lady Isobel Fitzpeter
 John MacAndrews as Bill Grant
 Gwynne Herbert as Lady Fitzpeter
 Jean Cadell as Vicar's wife

References

Bibliography
 Low, Rachael. History of the British Film, 1918-1929. George Allen & Unwin, 1971.

External links

1920 films
1920 comedy films
1920s fantasy comedy films
1920s English-language films
Films directed by Cecil Hepworth
Hepworth Pictures films
Films based on British novels
British black-and-white films
British silent feature films
Films shot at Nettlefold Studios
1920s British films
Silent fantasy comedy films
British fantasy comedy films